This is a list of Winston Churchill's family who have followed him into politics.

Winston Churchill

Notes:-
 a Churchill changed his party allegiance in April 1904.
 b Churchill changed his party allegiance in November 1924.

Second Generation

Randolph Churchill (Son)

Duncan Sandys (Son-in-Law)

Christopher Soames (Son-in-Law)

Third Generation

Winston Churchill (Grandson)

Nicholas Soames (Grandson)

Winston Churchill
Churchill, Winston